Loosu is a lake in Estonia.

See also
List of lakes of Estonia

Loosu
Võru Parish
Loosu